The 1936 Penn State Nittany Lions men's soccer team represented Pennsylvania State University during the 1936 season playing in the Eastern Intercollegiate Soccer League. It was the program's 26th season fielding a men's varsity soccer team. The 1936 season is William Jeffrey's 11th year at the helm.

Background 

The 1936 season was the Nittany Lions' 26th season as a varsity soccer program, and their 11th season playing as a part of the Intercollegiate Soccer Football Association. The team was led by 11th year head coach, William Jeffrey, who had previously served as the head coach for the semi-professional soccer team, Altoona Works.

At the end of the 1936 season Penn State was given an "outstanding" rating by the Eastern Intercollegiate Soccer Football Association along with Princeton, Syracuse and West Chester. The 1936 season marked the first time the Intercollegiate Soccer Football Association did not select a champion.

Squad

Roster

Schedule 

|-
!colspan=8 style=""| Regular season
|-

References

External links

1936 ISFA season
1936
American men's college soccer teams 1936 season
1936 in sports in Pennsylvania
1936